Holbæk Ladegård is a former manor house at Holbæk, Denmark. It is now home to Kunsthøjskolen, a folk high school specializing in art programmes. Holbæk Ladegård was for centuries a home farm under Holbæk Castle, which was built to protect Holbæk and was held in fee by royal vassals.

History
The estate is first mentioned in 1199 in a letter of gift from Bishop Absalon in which he grants it to Sorø Abbey. Holbæk later developed into a small market town, which Holbæk Castle was built to defend during troubled times. The castle was held in fee by royal vassals and Holbæk Ladegård served as the administrative center of the land. The estate was pawned several times and for a while referred to as the Duchy of Holbæk.

Christoffer Festenberg Pax was granted the land in 1563 and farmed it until his death in 1608. He constructed a new home farm at the Castle but it later fell into neglect. A new home farm was finally built after a report in 1627 described the old one as "dilapidated".

Holbæk Castle was destroyed by Swedish troops in 1659. The castle was not rebuilt but Holbæk Ladegård with its tenant farms was instead sold to Henrik Thott, the owner of Boltinggaard. He ran into economic difficulty and had to sell the estate in 1667. The new owner was Bertel Bartholin, a professor at the University of Copenhagen, but he soon sold it again. The estate then changed hands many times.

The estate was purchased by Gregers Juel in 1706. His son, Peder Juel, sold it to Hans Hansen Seidelin in 1752. He was already the owner of nearby Hagestedgård. He had no male heirs and the two estates were therefore entailed to his nephew, Hans Diderich de Brinck-Seidelin. It was the intention that he should create a stamhus for future generations of the  Brinck-Seidelin family. The legal effect of a stamhus was that the estate could neither be sold nor divided between several heirs. Brinck-Seidelin purchased Eriksholm in 1753 and the stamhus was finally established from the three estates in 1769. Brinck-Seidelin's son, Hans de Brinck-Seidelin, inherited the estates in 1772. He demolished the old buildings of the three estates and replaced them with a single one at a new site in 1798. The stamhus was dissolved with royal approbation in 1809.

Holbæk Ladegård was then sold to Hans Peder Kofoed, a merchant and shipowner from Copenhagen. His widow took over the estate after his death in 1812. She managed it with great skill during the agricultural crisis of the 1820s. After her death in 1839, it was acquired by F. V. Rottbøll. He sold most of the tenant farms to the tenant farmers. The remaining part of the estate was sold at auction after his death. The buyer was Baron Herman Frederik Løvenskiold. The estate then changed hands several times before it was purchased by Paul Dahl in 1913. He commissioned the architect Thorvald Jørgensen to refurbish the main building and also expanded the farm buildings.

Paul Dahl's son sold the estate to Holbæk Municipality in 1962. The land was then sold off in lots for new housing while the buildings and park were turned into a folk high school.

List of owners
 (      -1661)    The Crown
 (1661-1667)      Henrik Thott
 (1667-1676)      Bertel Bartholin
 (1676-1684)      Mouritz Podebusk
 (1684-1691)      Frederik Vittinghof Scheel
 (1691-1706)      Schack Brockdorff
 (1706-1731)      Gregers Juel
 (1731-1752)      Peder Juel
 (1752)           Hans Seidelin
 (1752-1772)      Hans Diderich de Brinck-Seidelin
 (1772-1809)      Hans de Brinck-Seidelin
 (1809-1812)      Hans Peder Kofoed
 (1812-1839)      Marie Kofoed
 (1839-1866)      F. Rottbøll
 (1866-1877)      Herman Frederik Løvenskiold
 (1877-1882)      J. Sønnichsen
 (1882-1912)      G. Ree
 (1912-1913)      Johannes Lawaetz
 (1913-1914)      M. Alstrup
 (1914-1939)      Paul Dahl
 (1939-1955)      Else Wørishøffer, married 1) Dahl, 2) Kastberg
 (1955-1963)      Torben Dahl-Kastberg
 (1963-      )    Kunsthøjskolen at Holbæk

References

External links

Manor houses in Holbæk Municipality
Holbæk